Chain of Lakes, Chain O'Lakes, or  Chain-O-Lakes is a common name for a series of lakes linked by waterways. Some of these include:

Bodies of water
 Chain of Lakes (Winter Haven), Florida
 Chain O'Lakes and Chain O'Lakes State Park (Illinois), in northeast Illinois
 The Chain of Lakes (Minneapolis) area in Minneapolis, Minnesota
 Chain of Lakes (Michigan)
 Chain of Lakes in Hill County, Montana
 Fulton Chain Lakes, New York
 Chain of Lakes (South Dakota)

Populated places
 Chain-O-Lakes, Indiana, an unincorporated community in St. Joseph County
 Chain-O-Lakes, Missouri, a village in Barry County
 Chain O' Lakes, Wisconsin

Other
Chain of Lakes Middle School, a public middle school in Windermere, Florida
Chain of Lakes Park, a baseball stadium in Winter Haven, Florida used by the Cleveland Indians for spring training
Chain O'Lakes State Park (Indiana), in northeast Indiana